Noongar (also Nyungar ) is an Australian Aboriginal language or dialect continuum, spoken by some members of the Noongar community and others. It is taught actively in Australia, including at schools, universities and through public broadcasting. The country of the Noongar people is the southwest corner of Western Australia. Within that region, many Noongar words have been adopted into English, particularly names of plants and animals.

Noongar was first recorded in 1801 by Matthew Flinders, who made a number of word lists.

Varieties of the Noongar subgroup

It is generally agreed that there was no single, standard Noongar (or Nyungar) language before European settlement: it was a subgroup (or possibly a dialect continuum) of closely related languages, whose speakers were differentiated geographically and, in some cases, by cultural practices. The dialects merged into the modern Noongar language following colonisation. A 1990 conference organised by the Nyoongar Language Project Advisory Panel recognised that the Noongar subgroup included at least three distinct languages. This was highlighted by the 2011 Noongar Dictionary, edited by Bernard Rooney, which was based on the Yuat (Juat) variety, from the northwest part of the Noongar subgroup area.

The highlighted area of the map shown here may correspond to the Noongar subgroup. The subdivisions shown correspond to individual varieties. In modern Noongar, these varieties have merged. There is controversy in some cases as to whether all of these varieties were part of the original Noongar subgroup. Some may have been distinct languages and some may have belonged to neighbouring subgroups.

Many linguists believe that the northernmost language shown, Amangu, was not part of the Noongar subgroup, was instead a part of the Kartu subgroup, and may have been a dialect of the Kartu language Nhanda. (As such, Amangu may have been synonymous with a dialect known as Nhanhagardi, which has also been classified, at different times, as a part of Nhanda, Noongar, or Widi.)

There is a general consensus that the following varieties belong to the Noongar subgroup: Wudjari, Minang, Bibelman (a.k.a. Pibelman; Bibbulman), Kaneang (Kaniyang), Wardandi, Balardung (a.k.a. Ballardong; which probably included Tjapanmay/Djabanmai), and Yuat (Juat). Wiilman, Whadjuk (Wajuk) and Pinjarup are also usually regarded as dialects of Noongar, although this identification is not completely secure. The Koreng (Goreng) people are thought to have spoken a dialect of, or closely related to, Wudjari, in which case their language would have been part of the Noongar subgroup. Njakinjaki (Nyakinyaki) was possibly a dialect of Kalaamaya – a language related to, but separate from, the original Noongar subgroup. It is not clear if the Njunga (or Nunga) dialect was significantly different from Wudjari.  However, according to Norman Tindale, the Njunga people rejected the name Wudjari and had adopted some of the customs of their non-Noongar-speaking eastern neighbours, the Ngadjunmaya.

Documentation
The Noongar names for birds were included in Serventy and Whittell's Birds of Western Australia (1948), noting their regional variations. A later review and synthesis of recorded names and consultation with Noongars produced a list of recommended orthography and pronunciation for birds (2009) occurring in the region. The author, Ian Abbott, also published these recommendations for plants (1983) and mammals (2001), and proposed that these replace other vernacular in common use.

A number of small wordlists were recorded in the early days of the Swan River Colony, for example Robert Menli Lyon's 1833 publication A Glance at the Manners and Language of Aboriginal Inhabitants of Western Australia. Lyon acquired much of his information from Yagan while Yagan was incarcerated on Carnac Island. Despite the significance of Lyon's work in being the first of its kind, George Fletcher Moore described Lyon's work as "containing many inaccuracies and much that was fanciful".

During August and October 1839 the Perth Gazette published Vocabulary of the Aboriginal people of Western Australia, written by Lieutenant Grey of HM 83rd Regiment. Grey spent twelve months studying the languages of the Noongar people and came to the conclusion that there was much in common between them. Just prior to publication, he received from Mr Bussel of the Busselton district a list of 320 words from that region which was near identical to those he had collected in the Swan River region. Much to Grey's disappointment, his work was published in an unfinished list as he was leaving the colony, but he believed that the publication would assist in communication between settlers and Noongar people. Also noted by Grey was that the Noongar language had no soft c sound, there was no use of f and that h was very rarely used and never at the start of a word.

Serious documentation of the Noongar language began in 1842 with the publication of A Descriptive Vocabulary of the Language in Common Use Amongst the Aborigines of Western Australia by George Fletcher Moore, later republished in 1884 as part of Moore's diary. This work included a substantial wordlist of Noongar. The first modern linguistic research on Noongar was carried out by Gerhardt Laves on the variety known as "Goreng", near Albany in 1930, but this material was lost for many years and has only recently been recovered. Beginning in the 1930s and then more intensively in the 1960s Wilfrid Douglas learnt and studied Noongar, eventually producing a grammar, dictionary, and other materials.

More recently, Noongar people have taken a major role in this work as researchers, for example Rose Whitehurst who compiled the Noongar Dictionary in her work for the Noongar Language and Culture Centre. Tim McCabe has recently finished a PhD in the Noongar language, having been taught a variety of the language by Clive Humphreys of Kellerberrin, and is teaching Noongar to inmates in Perth prisons.

Peter Bindon and Ross Chadwick have compiled an authoritative cross referenced "A Nyoongar Wordlist: from the South West of Western Australia", by assembling material from all of the above writers in their original spelling. It is clear from this reference that the orthographies used reflected not only dialectical differences, but also how the various authors "heard" and transcribed spoken Noongar.

Current situation

Neo-Nyungar 

An English dialect with Noongar admixture, known as Neo-Nyungar, is the community dialect of the Nyungar people.

Number of speakers 

On the 2016 census, 443 people identified themselves as speaking Noongar at home.

Since the late 20th century, there has been increased interest in reviving the Noongar/Nyungar language, including teaching it at many schools throughout the south west of Western Australia.  it is one of the 24 Aboriginal languages being taught at 68 schools in Western Australia to around 10,000 students.  Curtin University offers an open online Noongar language and culture course.

Noongar Language Centre

The Noongar Language and Culture Centre was set up at the Bunbury Aboriginal Progress Association in 1986, and grew to include offices in Northam and Perth. Authors such as Charmaine Bennell have released several books in the language. Educators Glenys Collard and Rose Whitehurst started recording elders speaking using Noongar language in 1990.

In 1997 at a meeting of around 200 Noongar people at Marribank, a standard orthography was agreed on for teaching the language in schools. A unanimous vote decided that the language would be spelt "Nyoongar", but later, as teaching and learning resources were being developed for the Languages Other Than English (LOTE) curriculum which would be taught in schools, it was decided to change to "Noongar".

By 2010, 37 schools in the South West and Perth were teaching the language.

In 2014, the Noongar Boodjar Language Cultural Aboriginal Corporation (NBLCAC) was incorporated, and the Commonwealth Government provided funding for four years from 2015 under the Indigenous Languages Support program to establish the Noongar Language Centre. The offices are located in Cannington.

Noongarpedia

In 2015 Professor Len Collard from the Indigenous Studies faculty at the University of Western Australia challenged the science behind the claim that it is an endangered language, citing the lack of rigour in the data. Collard began leading a project to create the "Noongarpedia", recording the language in a wiki format, allowing for expansion over time. The project is continuing , with the site growing in the Wikimedia Incubator. It is  the first Wikipedia in an Aboriginal Australian language site, but it is intended to be bilingual, so as to be used as a teaching aid in schools.

Language through the arts
Singer-songwriter Gina Williams has promoted the use of the language through song, including lullabies for children and a translation of the song "Moon River".

An adaption and translation of the Shakespearean tragedy Macbeth into Noongar was performed at the 2020 Perth Festival. The play, named Hecate, is produced by Yirra Yaakin Theatre Company with Bell Shakespeare, and performed by an all-Noongar cast. The play took years to translate, and has sparked wider interest in reviving the language.

Phonology
The following are the sounds in the Noongar language:

Vowels

Consonants

Vocabulary
Many words vary in a regular way from dialect to dialect, depending on the area.

A large number of modern place names in Western Australia end in -up, such as Joondalup, Nannup and Manjimup. This is because in the Noongar language, -up means "place of". For example, the name Ongerup means "place of the male kangaroo".

The word for smoke, was adopted for the family of compounds known as karrikins. The word  "to be hit on the head" comes from the term for a stone axe. The word quokka, denoting a type of small macropod, is thought to come from Noongar.

Pronunciation

Grammar
Noongar grammar is fairly typical of Pama–Nyungan languages in that it is agglutinating, with words and phrases formed by the addition of affixes to verb and noun stems.   Word order in Noongar is free, but generally tends to follow a subject–object–verb pattern.  Because there are several varieties of Noongar, aspects of grammar, syntax and orthography are highly regionally variable.

Verbs
Like most Australian languages, Noongar has a complex tense and aspect system.  The plain verb stem functions as both the infinitive and the present tense.  Verb phrases are formed by adding suffixes or adverbs to the verb stem.

The following adverbs are used to indicate grammatical tense or aspect.
later ("will eat later")
 future ("will eat after a while")
 conditional ("should eat")

Some tense/aspect distinctions are indicated by use of a verb suffix.  In Noongar, the past or preterite tense is the same as the past participle.
-inyprogressive ("eating")
-gapast ("ate, had eaten")

A few adverbs are used with the past tense to indicate the amount of time since the event of the verb took place.
 a long time ("ate a long time ago")
a short time ("ate a little while ago")
just now ("just ate")

Nouns
There are no articles in Noongar.
Nouns (as well as adjectives) take a variety of suffixes which indicate grammatical case, specifically relating to motion or direction, among other distinctions.

-(a)klocative ("in the tree")
-(a)kpurposive ("for meat")
-(a)linstrumental ("by means of a spear")
-an/anggenitive ("your grandmother")
-(a)pplace-of ("place of trees")
-koorlillative ("towards the water")
-oolablative ("away from the water")
-ngatadessive ("near the water")
-(a)binytranslative ("becoming strong")
-mokinysemblative ("like a dog")
-booronghaving or existing ("getting dark")
-brooabessive ("without a coat")
-kadakcomitative ("with food")
-mitused-for (, "a spear is used for hunting kangaroos")
-koopbelong-to, inhabitant of ("river dweller")
-djilemphatic ("very good")
-martspecies or family ("crow species")
-(i)lagentive suffix used with ergative

The direct object of a sentence (what might be called the dative) can also be expressed with the locative suffix -ak.

Grammatical number is likewise expressed by the addition of suffixes.  Nouns that end in vowels take the plural suffix -man, whereas nouns that end in consonants take -gar.  Inanimate nouns, that is, nouns that do not denote human beings, can also be pluralized by the simple addition of a numeral.

Pronouns
Noongar pronouns are declined exactly as nouns, taking the same endings.  Thus, possessive pronouns are formed by the addition of the regular genitive suffix -ang.  Conversely, object pronouns are formed by the addition of the -any suffix.  Notably, there does not appear to be a great deal of pronominal variation across dialectal lines.

{| class="wikitable"
|-
!          !! Subject !! Object !! Possessive
|-
!I
|||||
|-
!he/she/it
|||||
|-
!they
|||||
|-
!you
|||||
|-
!we
|||||
|}

Noongar features a set of dual number pronouns which identify interpersonal relationships based on kinship or marriage.  The "fraternal" dual pronouns are used by and for people who are siblings or close friends, "paternal" dual pronouns are used by and for people who are paternal relatives (parent-child, uncle-niece and so forth), and "marital" pronouns are used by and for people who are married to each other or are in-laws.

{| class="wikitable"
|-
!          !! Fraternal !! Paternal !! Marital
|-
!1st person
|||||
|-
!2nd person
|||||
|-
!3rd person
|||||
|}

Typically, if the subject of a sentence is not qualified by a numeral or adjective, a subject-marker pronoun is used.  Thus:  (lit. "kangaroo it on-rock standing"), "the kangaroo is standing on the rock."

Adjectives
Adjectives precede nouns.  Some adjectives form the comparative by addition of the suffix -jin but more generally the comparative is formed by reduplication, a common feature in Pama-Nyungan languages.  The same is also true for intensified or emphatic adjectives, comparable to the English word very.  The superlative is formed by the addition of -jil.

Negation
Statements are negated by adding the appropriate particle to the end of the sentence.  There are three negation particles:
used generally with verbs
used generally with adjectives

There is also an adverbial negation word, roughly equivalent to the English less or without.

Interrogatives
Questions are formed by the addition of the interrogative interjection  alongside the infinitive root of the verb.

See also
Boodjar Nyungar Placenames

Notes

References

External links

 Bibliography of Bibbulman language and people resources, at the Australian Institute of Aboriginal and Torres Strait Islander Studies
 Noongarpedia word list (under construction)
 Billardong Noongar Waangkany Ballardong Noongar dictionary
 Digital Daisy Bates, digitised and geo-tagged lists of Aboriginal words, including Noongar